Reux is a commune in the Calvados department of Normandy, France.

Reux may also refer to:

Reux, Belgium, a commune in the Belgian city of Ciney

People with the surname:
Victor Reux (1929–2016), French and politician and educator
Françoise Reux, maiden name of Canadian author Françoise Enguehard